The 1900 Canadian federal election was held on November 7, 1900 to elect members of the House of Commons of Canada of the 9th Parliament of Canada. As a result of the election, the Liberal Party, led by Prime Minister Wilfrid Laurier, was re-elected to a second majority government, defeating the Conservative Party and Liberal-Conservatives led by Charles Tupper.

National results 

Notes:

* Party did not nominate candidates in the previous election.

x - indicates less than 0.005% of the popular vote.

1 Ralph Smith is reported to have run as an Independent Labour candidate in Vancouver. He was elected defeating both a Liberal and Conservative, but immediately joined the Liberal Party caucus when he took his seat in the House of Commons. Some records suggest that he ran as a Liberal in 1900. He was subsequently re-elected as a "Liberal" in 1904 and 1908, and was defeated in 1911. He is listed in these tables as having been elected as a Liberal.

2 Arthur Puttee of Winnipeg was elected as a Labour candidate in a 1900 by-election, and was re-elected as an Independent Labour MP in the subsequent 1900 election.

Results by province

Notes:

xx - indicates less than 0.05% of the popular vote.

See also
 
List of Canadian federal general elections
List of political parties in Canada
9th Canadian Parliament

References 

 Federal
1900
November 1900 events